is a song by Japanese recording artist Misia. It was released as a digital single in Chaku-Uta format on February 4, 2009. The song was first introduced during The Tour of Misia Discotheque Asia. Later, it was handpicked to be the theme song for the TBS TV special Kandō! Kita no Daishizen Special 'Mori no Love Letter' Kuramoto Sō ga Okuru, Hateshinai Inochi no Monogatari. The song was subsequently released as a B-side on Misia's twenty-second single "Ginga/Itsumademo."

Track listing

Charts

References 

2009 songs
Misia songs
Songs written by Misia